Vladychnevo is a rural locality (a village) in Novlenskoye Rural Settlement, Vologodsky District, Vologda Oblast, Russia. The population was 165 as of 2002.

Geography 
The distance to Vologda is 75 km, to Novlenskoye is 15 km. Mitenskoye, Dilyalevo, Lepigino, Nagornovo are the nearest rural localities.

References 

Rural localities in Vologodsky District